"See You Again" is a song by American country music artist Carrie Underwood. It was written by Underwood, Hillary Lindsey, and David Hodges. It was released as the fourth and final single from Underwood's fourth studio album, Blown Away, on April 15, 2013. Underwood announced the single on her official Twitter account.

Underwood debuted the song on the twelfth season of American Idol on April 4, 2013. "See You Again" is Underwood's eighteenth consecutive Top 10 single on the Billboard Hot Country Songs chart and is also her seventeenth single to be certified at least Gold by the RIAA. As of December 2013, the single has sold 740,000 copies in the United States. On August 10, 2015, "See You Again" was officially certified as Platinum.

Content
"See You Again" tells the story of moving onwards after experiencing the death of a loved one in life. The lyrics provide hope and promise through Underwood's belief that one will reunite with every fallen loved one in the afterlife. The song's opening consists of a solo piano, followed by a backing chorus and band kicking in shortly after.

"See You Again" was originally one of three songs written for the 2010 feature film The Chronicles of Narnia: The Voyage of the Dawn Treader. Of the three songs that Underwood, Hodges, and Lindsey co-wrote for the film, the workers behind the project opted to choose "There's a Place For Us." Underwood pushed to include "See You Again" on her fourth studio album, Blown Away, during the writing process of the album.

Composition
See You Again is written in the key of A-flat major, with a vocal range from F3 to D5.

Critical reception
The song has received positive reviews from music critics. Billboard.com described the song to be "truly a taste of heaven." Kevin John Coyne of Country Universe included the song in his personal favorite tracks from the Blown Away studio album in the website's 2012 year-end countdown of editors' favorite Country albums of the year, as did Matt Bjorke of Roughstock for their album countdown. Liv Carter of Urban Country News gave the song a "thumbs up", adding "what pulls it over the line however, and presumably why it has become a fan-favorite, is its sincerity in wishing to bring comfort and Underwood’s confident performance." Jonathan Keefe of Slant Magazine was less favorable, saying that "the chorus of power ballad "See You Again" is marred by dated, campy arena-rock clichés."

Commercial performance
The song debuted at No. 60 on the US Country Airplay chart for the week of April 13, 2013, and peaked at No. 2 for the chart dated September 7, 2013.  It entered the Billboard Hot 100 at No. 90 for the chart dated May 18, 2013, and peaked at No. 34 for the chart of August 31, 2013.  It also peaked at No.7 on the Hot Country Songs chart on August 24, 2013.  As of December 2013, the single has sold 740,000 copies in the United States.

On August 10, 2015 "See You Again" was officially certified as Platinum.

Live Performances
Underwood gave the debut performance of the single on season twelve of American Idol on April 4, 2013. She served as closing headliner at CMA Music Fest on June 9, 2013, and included the song in her set. On June 5, 2013, she paid tribute to the 24 victims who lost their lives in tornados that devastated Oklahoma on May 20, performing the song at the CMT Music Awards and donating $1 million toward relief efforts. Underwood performed the song on May 13, 2018 during an episode of American Idol in which she mentored the top five contestants. The song was included in the setlist for the Cry Pretty Tour. Following the passing of Naomi Judd on April 30, 2022, Underwood dedicated a live performance of the song to the singer.

Awards and nominations

CMT Music Awards

|-
| align="center"|2014 ||align="center"| "See You Again" ||align="center"| Video of the Year || 
|-
| align="center"|2014 ||align="center"| "See You Again" ||align="center"| Female Video of the Year ||

World Music Awards 

|-
| align="center"|2013 ||align="center"| "See You Again" ||align="center"| World's Best Video || 
|-
| align="center"|2013 ||align="center"| "See You Again" ||align="center"| World's Best Song ||

Music video
On June 7, 2013, Good Morning America gave a first look at the music video for "See You Again". The full video premiered soon after on ABCNews.com. The music video was directed by Eric Welch. It showed the aftermaths of the Sandy Hook Elementary School shooting, the September 11 attacks and the 2013 Moore, Oklahoma, tornado, along with various reunions, and YouTube footage that includes a Kodiak bear waving.

Track listing
Digital download
 "See You Again" – 4:07

Charts and certifications

Weekly charts

Year-end charts

Certifications

Release history

References

2013 singles
2012 songs
Carrie Underwood songs
Songs written by Carrie Underwood
Songs written by Hillary Lindsey
Songs written by David Hodges
Song recordings produced by Mark Bright (record producer)
Arista Nashville singles
Country ballads